Yolanda Retter (December 4, 1947 – August 18, 2007) was an American lesbian librarian, archivist, scholar, and activist in Los Angeles, California, United States of America.

Early life 
Retter was born in Connecticut but spent most of her childhood in El Salvador. Her mother was Peruvian and her father was American. Her first encounter with racism took place when she was twelve years old, when she returned to school in Connecticut. This incident spearheaded her activism.

Education 
Retter attended Pitzer College in Claremont, California and graduated in 1970 with a degree in sociology. In the 1980s she completed master's degrees in library science (1983) and social work (1987) from the University of California, Los Angeles and in 1996 she received her Ph.D. in American Studies from the University of New Mexico, Albuquerque.

Career
Before becoming a librarian and archivist, Retter held a variety of jobs, some as a volunteer. She worked in prison and parole programs, as a director of a rape hotline, and original publisher of the Los Angeles Women's Yellow Pages. She then became the founding archivist of the Lesbian Legacy Collection at the ONE Archives and volunteered at the June Mazer Lesbian Archives.

From 2003 to the time of her death, Retter served as the head librarian and archivist of the Chicano Studies Research Center at the University of California, Los Angeles.

Personal life 
She died after a short battle with cancer surrounded by women she chose, including her partner of thirteen years: Leslie Golden Stampler.

Publications
 "Childcare." Encyclopedia of Feminist Theories. ed. Lorraine Code. New York: Routledge, 2002.
Gay and Lesbian Rights in the United States: A Documentary History with Walter Lee Williams (Eds.). Westport, CT: Greenwood Press, 2003.
 Great Events in History: Gay Lesbian, Bisexual, Transgender Events. with Lillian Faderman, Horacio Roque Ramirez, et al. (Eds.). Pasadena: Salem Press, 2006
 Identity Development of Lifelong vs. Catalyzed Latina Lesbians. M.A. Thesis. University of California Los Angeles, 1987.
 "Lesbian Activism in Los Angeles (1970-1979)," Queers in Space: Communities, Public Places, Sites of Resistance. eds. Anne-Marie Bouthillette, Gordon Brent Ingram, and Yolanda Retter. Bay Press, 1997. 
 "Los Angeles." Encyclopedia of Lesbian Histories and Cultures, ed. Bonnie Zimmerman. NY: Routledge, 2000. 479–480.
 On the Side of Angels: Lesbian Activism in Los Angeles, 1970-1990. Ph.D. dissertation, University of New Mexico, 1998.
 "Sisterhood is Possible." Time It Was: American Stories from the Sixties. eds. Karen Manners Smith and Tim Koster. London: Pearson, 2007.
 "Lesbians." Oxford Encyclopedia of Latinos and Latinas in the United States. New York: Oxford, 2005.
 "Martinez, Betita." Encyclopedia of Activism and Social Justice. eds. Gary L. Anderson and Kathryn G. Herr. Thousand Oaks, CA: SAGE Publications, 2007.
 "Preservation of LGBT History: The ONE Archive." Pathways to Progress: Issues and Advances in Latino Librarianship. eds. John L. Ayala and Salvador Güereña. Santa Barbara, CA: ABC-CLIO, 2012.

Lesbian News articles by Retter 
"Activist and Tenant's Rights Attorney Lisa Korben Dies at 55." Jun. 2005, Vol. 30, Issue 11, p. 15.
"ACW Founder Brenda Weathers Dies." May 2005, Vol. 30, Issue 10, p. 17.
"Alice Dunbar-Nelson." Dec. 1998, Vol. 24, Issue 5, p. 60.
"Barbara Gittings (1932-2007)." Apr. 2007, Vol. 32, Issue 9, p. 5.
"Djuna Barnes." Jan. 1999. Vol. 24, Issue 6, p. 52.
"Dyke March: A Herstory." Jun. 1999. Vol. 24, Issue 11, p. 29.
"Festivals: Born from Womyn's Music." [cowritten with Renee McBride] Aug. 1995, Vol. 21, Issue 1, p. 31.
"Herstory: Catalina de Erauso." Jun. 1998, Vol. 23, Issue 11, p. 68.
"Herstory: Deborah Sampson." Nov. 1998. Vol. 24, Issue 4, p. 52.
"Herstory: Elaine Noble." Sep. 1998, Vol. 24, Issue 2, p. 52.
"Herstory: Eva Le Gallienne." Jan. 1998, Vol. 23, Issue 6, p. 56.
"Herstory: Lillian Wald." Apr. 1998, Vol. 23, Issue 9, p. 56.
"Herstory: Mary Lewis." Feb. 1998, Vol. 23, Issue 7, p. 56.
"Herstory: Mina Meyer and Sharon Raphael." Mar. 1998, Vol. 23, Issue 8, p. 56.
"In Memoriam of Johnnie Phelps." May 1998, Vol. 23, Issue 10, p. 64.
"[In Memoriam] of Alla Nazimova." Jul. 1998, Vol. 23, Issue 12, p. 52.
"The Ladies of Llargollen." Mar. 1999, Vol. 24, Issue 8, p. 64.
"Lesbian Los Angeles." March 1995, Vol. 20 Issue 8, p. 62-63.
"The LNs Herstory is the Chronicle of Our Story." Aug. 1999, Vol. 25, Issue 1, p. 29.
"Ruth Ellis." Feb. 1999, Vol. 24, Issue 7, p. 56.
"Sarah Josephine Baker." Apr. 1999, Vol. 24, Issue 9, p. 52.

References

1948 births
2007 deaths
20th-century American historians
American librarians
American women librarians
Chicana feminists
Hispanic and Latino American librarians
Lesbian feminists
LGBT people from Connecticut
American LGBT rights activists
Pitzer College alumni
LGBT studies academics
LGBT Hispanic and Latino American people
People from Los Angeles
Writers from New Haven, Connecticut
UCLA Graduate School of Education and Information Studies alumni
UCLA Luskin School of Public Affairs alumni
20th-century American women
Historians from California
Historians from Connecticut
20th-century LGBT people
21st-century American women